Kenneth Marks (15 June 1920 – 13 January 1988) was a Labour Party politician in the United Kingdom.

Marks was Member of Parliament (MP) for Manchester Gorton from a 1967 by-election to 1983. From 1975 to 1979, he was a junior Environment minister.

He was educated at the Central High School, Manchester and Manchester Academy (secondary school).  In 1955 he unsuccessfully contested Manchester Moss Side at the general election.

Before his by-election success, Marks served as a Labour councillor on the Denton Urban District Council, representing Denton West.  Prior to entering parliament Marks was also a secondary school head teacher. He was also a member of the National Union of Teachers and served on its advisory committee for secondary schools. In parliament he was chairman of the Labour Party's social security group and vice chairman of its education group, as well as serving on the Select committee on Education and Science. From 1970 to 1971 he served as a  whip.

Although reselected to fight Manchester Gorton at the 1983 general election, boundary changes substantially altered the constituency boundaries, with the largest part of the constituency, Denton and Audenshaw in Tameside Metropolitan Borough, merging with Reddish in Stockport Metropolitan Borough to form a new Denton and Reddish constituency.  Gorton was included with much of the former Manchester Ardwick constituency, which was renamed Manchester Gorton.

As there were potentially three Labour MPs contesting two new seats, Marks, who was the senior of the three, stood down, allowing Stockport North's Andrew Bennett to inherit Denton and Reddish and Gerald Kaufman to move across from Ardwick to the new Gorton seat.

References

Times Guide to the House of Commons 1979

1920 births
1988 deaths
Labour Party (UK) MPs for English constituencies
UK MPs 1966–1970
UK MPs 1970–1974
UK MPs 1974
UK MPs 1974–1979
UK MPs 1979–1983
Parliamentary Private Secretaries to the Prime Minister